Citywire is a London-based financial publishing and information group.

It provides news, information and insight for professional advisers and investors globally. The company specialises in tracking the performance of fund managers.

Citywire is a private holdings company with over 200 employees based in London, Milan, Munich, Singapore and New York.

History
Citywire was founded in 1999 by business journalists from the Independent on Sunday and the Mail on Sunday. In 2001 Reuters acquired a stake in the company. Alongside Reuters, Investor Clifford Gundle also holds a large stake in the company.

The company began publishing magazines in 2003 and continues to add weekly and international titles to its catalog. It publishes a variety of magazines aimed at financial advisors and asset management firms, together with daily business news.

Since its launch, Citywire has expanded to become a global operation with offices in Munich, Singapore, Milan and New York.

There are currently 9 executive directors in the company.

Products

Magazines 
Citywire publishes an array of magazines which are targeted at the global intermediated asset management industry. This audience is made up of professional fund investors (intermediaries) such as financial advisers, stockbrokers, wealth managers and private bankers.

Those in the intermediary asset management industry choose funds on behalf of their clients - individuals and families - looking to grow or preserve their wealth over the medium to long term. It is these professional investors who read the news and commentary published through Citywire's magazines, apps and websites.

Citywire publications include: 
 Citywire Americas - for the US offshore and Latin American investment communities
 Citywire Asia - for private wealth professionals in Asia
 Citywire Consulenza Evoluta - for Italy's promoter community of financial advisers
 Citywire Deutschland - for Germany's professional investor community
 Citywire Professional Buyer - for fund analysts and manager researchers in the US domestic market
Citywire RIA - for registered investment advisors in the US domestic market
 Citywire Switzerland - for Swiss independent asset managers
 Citywire Selector - for international fund selectors
 Citywire Wealth Manager - for investment advisers, wealth managers and stockbrokers
 Modern Investor - for institutional investors
 New Model Adviser - for independent financial advisers and planners

Events

Citywire holds over 60 events a year, bringing together professional investors and asset managers in venues across the globe.

These events see between 10 and 30 managers present to investors and asset managers in small groups, usually six or less. Over two or three days industry professionals see a variety of managers running different classes.

Between sessions there are also external speakers who present their views on anything from the global economic outlook to the future of the trade business.

These events are free of charge but only open to qualified investors, wealth managers and advisers by personal selection from Citywire.

Fund Manager Ratings

Citywire Fund Manager Ratings track managers, not their funds, looking at how they've performed across all the funds they've run, wherever they've run them over the past three years.

The methodology is purely quantitative, rewarding managers for superior risk-adjusted returns. The service judges fund managers on performance relative to a benchmark on the funds they run. Citywire chooses the benchmark, just in case the asset management group has chosen one it believes is not robust enough.

Fund Manager Ratings is an impartial service and nobody can pay Citywire to rate a manager. Citywire rates all eligible managers (around 15,000 active managers in 41 countries around the world).

Awards
Citywire hosts awards for fund managers in the financial services industry. The basis of the awards is strictly mathematical, with no human verdict.

See also 
 Morningstar
 Reuters
 Bloomberg

References

External links
Website

Financial services companies of the United Kingdom
1999 establishments in the United Kingdom
Multinational companies based in the City of London
British companies established in 1999
Publishing companies based in London
Financial services companies established in 1999